Shalimar (Howrah) Express is an Indian Railways train in the North Eastern Railway Zone of Lucknow Division. It operates weekly, departing from Gorakhpur Junction on Monday and from Shalimar railway station on Tuesday. The Shalimar (Howrah) Express consists of 18 coaches including one  AC-II coach, one AC-III coach, eight sleeper class coaches, six general (unreserved) coaches and two SLR.

Schedule

Rake Sharing

15029/15030 - Gorakhpur-Pune Weekly Express (Via Lucknow)

Coach composition

Journey

Rail transport in Howrah
Passenger trains originating from Gorakhpur
Railway services introduced in 2010
Named passenger trains of India
Rail transport in Jharkhand
Rail transport in Bihar
Rail transport in West Bengal
Express trains in India